Kingmaker is a 2022 South Korean political drama film, written and directed by Sung-Hyun for Seed Film and starring Sol Kyung-gu, Lee Sun-kyun and Yoo Jae-myung. It was scheduled to be theatrically released on December 29, 2021, but due to rapid increase in COVID-19 pandemic it was released on January 26, 2022, to coincide with Korean New Year holidays. The film was also officially invited in competition section at the 24th Udine Far East Film Festival held from April 22 to 30, 2022.

On box office, currently it is at 10th place among all the Korean films released in the year 2022, with gross of US$6.05 million and 761,334 admissions.

Premise
The film is based on anecdotal accounts of the working relationship between Kim Dae-jung and his political strategist Uhm Chang-rok during his political career. Seo Chang-dae is a political strategist who prioritizes winning above all else, while Kim Woon-beom is a politician with ambitions to become president so that he can change the country for the better.

Cast
 Sol Kyung-gu as Kim Woon-beom
 Lee Sun-kyun as Seo Chang-dae, political strategist
 Yoo Jae-myung as Kim Young-ho
 Jo Woo-Jin as Director Lee
 Park In-hwan as Kang In-san
 Bae Jong-ok as Hee-ran
 Lee Hae-Young as Lee Han-Sang 
 Kim Sung-oh as secretary Park
 Seo Eun-soo as Soo-yeon, support staff
 Kim Sae-byuk as Myung-sook
 Park Hyung-soo as Jeong-hyeon
 Jeon Bae-soo as Lee's assistant
 Jung Woo-hyuk as Chief of the Joint Chiefs of Staff
 Yoon Kyung-ho as Mr. Kim, politician of the ruling party
 Lee Hwa-ryong as opposition lawmaker
 Yoon Se-woong as secretary Kim Woon-beom
 Kim Joo-ryoung
 Son Kyung-won as New Democratic Party campaigner

Production
Sol Kyung-gu was cast in the film in July 2018 as politician and Lee Sun-kyun as political strategist. Director Byun Sung-Hyun and Sol Kyung-gu are working together after 2017 crime thriller film The Merciless. On March 29, 2019, on completion of cast line-up the script reading site was revealed by releasing photos.

Director Byun Sung-Hyun worked with his old team for the film. Art director Han Ah-reum, Kim Hong-jip and Lee Jin-hee (music) and Lee Gil-gyu, director of Lighting have worked with him on The Merciless.

Principal photography began on March 25, 2019.

Release
The film was scheduled for release on December 29, 2021 but due to fresh wave of COVID-19 pandemic it has been postponed to January 2022 to coincide with Korean New Year holiday. It was released on January 26, 2022.

The film was officially invited in competition section of the 24th Udine Far East Film Festival held from April 22 to 30, 2022.

Home media
The film was made available for streaming on IPTV (Olleh TV, SK Btv, TV, LG U+TV), Home Choice, TVING, Naver TV, WAVVE, Google Play, KT skylife, Cinefox and KakaoPage from February 24, 2022.

Reception

Box office
The film was released on 1184 screens on January 26, 2022. As per Korean Film Council (Kofic) integrated computer network, the film opened at 2nd place with 58,974 admissions at the Korean box office. It maintained its no 2 position at the Korean box office for consecutive 14 days after its release.

, it is at 12th place among all the Korean films released in the year 2022, with gross of US$6.00 million and 775,583 admissions.

Critical response
Song Kyung-won of Cine21 wrote that the film differed from other political dramas and films as it focused on the relationships between the main characters rather than politics or the actual plot, given the fact that the storyline itself was a thinly-veiled reference to Kim Dae-jung's presidential election campaign. Song appreciated the direction of Byun Seong-hyeon's writing, "From the stylish scenes, sensuous shooting, and the strong chemistry between the characters, the director's talents are still alive." Concluding the review, Song observed that Seo's use of negative campaigning to help Kim win raised a fundamental question about whether the end justifies the means.

Accolades

References

External links
 
 
 
 

2022 films
2020s Korean-language films
Films postponed due to the COVID-19 pandemic
South Korean political drama films
Films set in 1961
Films set in 1967
Films set in 1969
Films set in 1970
Films set in 1971
Films set in 1988
Films set in Seoul
Films set in Gangwon Province, South Korea
Films set in South Jeolla Province
Films about politicians
Films about presidential elections
Drama films based on actual events
Political films based on actual events
South Korean films based on actual events